Matthew Jonathan Wicks (born 8 September 1978) is an English former professional footballer who played as a central defender.

Wicks was viewed as "one of the most promising players of his generation" but never lived up to the label.

Club career
Born in Reading, Wicks began his career with youth contracts at both Arsenal and Manchester United, but failed to make a league appearance for either team. After being released by Arsenal in 1998, Wicks signed for Crewe Alexandra, where he made six league appearances. Wicks later signed for Peterborough United, making a total of 31 league appearances. While at Peterborough, Wicks spent a loan spell with Brighton & Hove Albion, and later signed for Brighton on a permanent deal. In his two spells at Brighton, he made 26 league appearances. After leaving Brighton, Wicks signed for Hull City, where he made 14 league appearances. After leaving Hull in July 2002, Wicks moved to Australia to play with the Newcastle United Jets, under the management of former Norwich City player Ian Crook, but never appeared for the club. He was released from his contract in August 2003 on compassionate grounds because of the illness of a relative, and retired from football soon afterwards.

International career
Wicks was captain of the England national under-17 football team.

Honours
Peterborough United	
Football League Third Division playoffs: 2000

Personal life
Wicks is the son of fellow footballer Steve Wicks and grandson of former Chelsea F.C. chairman Brian Mears.

References

External links

1978 births
Living people
Sportspeople from Reading, Berkshire
English footballers
Association football defenders
Arsenal F.C. players
Manchester United F.C. players
Crewe Alexandra F.C. players
Peterborough United F.C. players
Brighton & Hove Albion F.C. players
Hull City A.F.C. players
Newcastle Jets FC players
English Football League players
English expatriate footballers
English expatriate sportspeople in Australia
Expatriate soccer players in Australia
Footballers from Berkshire